Alfred Wróbel (29 November 1927 – 24 September 1993) was a Polish ice hockey player. He played for Górnik Katowice and GKS Katowice during his career. He also played for the Polish national team at the 1952 and 1956 Winter Olympics. Two of his brothers, Adolf and Antoni, also played for Poland at the Olympics; Adolf in 1956, and Antoni in 1952.

References

External links
 

1927 births
1993 deaths
GKS Katowice (ice hockey) players
Ice hockey players at the 1952 Winter Olympics
Ice hockey players at the 1956 Winter Olympics
Olympic ice hockey players of Poland
Sportspeople from Katowice